William Starr Miller I (August 22, 1793 – November 9, 1854) was a U.S. Representative from New York.

Biography
Born in Wintonbury, Connecticut, Miller completed preparatory studies.
He served as member of the Board of Aldermen of New York City in 1845.

Miller was elected as an American Party candidate to the Twenty-ninth Congress (March 4, 1845-March 3, 1847).
He was an unsuccessful candidate for reelection in 1846 to the Thirtieth Congress.
He died in New York City November 9, 1854.
He was interred in Greenwood Cemetery, Brooklyn, New York.

Legacy
William Starr Miller II, his nephew, born two years after his death, was named in his honor.

References

1793 births
1854 deaths
People from Bloomfield, Connecticut
Know-Nothing members of the United States House of Representatives from New York (state)
Burials at Green-Wood Cemetery